Martin Richard may refer to:

 A pen name of John Creasey, English crime and science fiction writer
 Martin William Richard, an 8-year-old boy who was killed in the Boston Marathon bombing on April 15, 2013

See also
Martin Richards (disambiguation)